Shahkot is a small city and one of the five tehsils of Jalandhar district in Punjab, India. Shahkot is situated on Jalandhar-Moga-Barnala-Sirsa National Highway 703 (Old NH 71). Shahkot is administered by the Municipal Committee. About 176 villages belong to Shahkot tehsil. Shahkot was famous for its red chili peppers; but now, its main crops are Wheat, Paddy, Maize, potato, etc. Agricultural land is not suitable for paddy. But with the use of pesticides and tubewell water; paddy is grown.

Geography 
The region has an average elevation of 209 metres (688 feet). The Pin Code of Shahkot is 144702. Shahkot is 
a subdivision and tehsil of Jalandhar Distt.

Demographics
As of the 2011 Indian census, Shahkot has population of 25,449. The population is 53% male and 47% female. Shahkot has an average literacy rate of 83%, which is higher than the Indian national average of 59.5%. Literacy among men is 85.50% and female literacy is 80.50%. In Shahkot, 12% of the population is under 6 years of age. Hinduism and Sikhism are the predominant religions with 60% of the population registering as Hindus, 39% registering as Sikhs and 1% of other religions. Shahkot is near the Sutlej river which divides Doaba and Malwa.
Shahkot took about three centuries to take its present form. Three centuries ago, this was a deserted place. In 1700 A.D. a Mohammedean Saint named Sayyad Satt Shah Sadni inhabited this place. He named this town “Shahkot” after his name. In those days, the families of Khuda Bakash Arayan, Hayyat Gujjar and Jann Mohd flourished here. These mohamaddeans did their best to make this land cultivable. About one century later Badesha Jatts (Bandesha/Badechha) took hold of this town. About two hundred years ago, a person named  Amrika(Badesha Jatt)] from village Dhianpur (Amritsar) inhabited the village kang(sardar wala kang) on his maternal Dheri which is situated about 10-12 kilometers away from Shahkot, Amrika had three sons. Man Singh, Daan Singh and Sujan Singh Badichah-all 3 sons  of Tara Singh’s sister joined <ref></ref> Tara Singh Gaiba (Dallewalia Misl), Sujan Singh was killed when he went to capture Nakodar with Tara Singh. In those days Gaiba was a popular personality of Shahkot, They took hold of Shahkot and adjoining villages. After sometime all ancestors of Daan singh died. But ancestors of Maan Singh and Sujan Singh accepting the dominance of Maharaja Ranjit Singh kept hold on Shahkot and Dharamkot.</p>
Accordingly, to the views of some people, They were called the Gumashatas of Maharaja Ranjit Singh. The British took over Shahkot and change it into a [ Jagir], there were 22 villages in this jagir including “Dhandowal”. The ancestors of Maan Singh inhabited in village Dhadowal. Narain Singh s/o Gurbux Singh Grandson of Sujan Singh became the Zaildar of Shahkot. S.Bhoop Singh grandson of Maan Singh was issueless. He had four wives. The fort in which they lived was called “Womens Fort-Mayiaan wala Kila”. These widows were given 1200 rupees annual pension by the British Govt. Dalip Singh s/o Gurbux Singh remained Sub-Registrar as well as zaildar of Shahkot. Next Kishan Singh Grand Son of Dalip Singh became Zaildar of Shahkot. The British honoured him with the title of “Sardar”. He was always given a seat in the Darbar of the British.
The families of Badesha Sardar S.Balbir Singh Badesha, famous poet Fatahjit, Hardev Singh Peeta are inhabited at Shahkot now.
Before 1947, Shahkot and adjoining villages had main Muslim population, During partition, like this rest of the Punjab, the sad event which occurred here are narrated by the elders with heavy hearts. During communal riots some Hindus and Sikhs looted the Mohamadans leaving for Pakistan. Aslam, of nearby village Mianwal along with other Mohammadans, burnt 7 villages of Hindus or Sikhs. At last he was killed by a mob. According to the elders, the school in Nangal Ambia(near Shahkot) was called Islamia School before partition. Chowdhary Mohmmad became the working President of Pakistan for sometime. River Satluj flowed just near shahkot some time past, Now-a-days it flows about 6 or 7 kilometers far from Shahkot.
Shahkot has given birth to many famous personalities. Among these some were born at Shahkot some inhabited here from outside. Among poets, Pushap shahkot and Fatahjit are well known. Who doesnot know Dr Shadi Ram Behl and his son Dr. Ashok Kumar Behl of Shahkot, he got education in allopathy(M.B.B.S) from Calcutta University in the year 1920 and was the first converted homoeopath of north India he was also a freedom fighter of first order, he started his clinic “Dr. Shadi Ram Behl’s Multispeciality Clinic” at jalandhar which is still serving people since 1925, Puran Shahkotee (Guru of Hans Raj Hans and father of Master Saleem), Bibi Nooran and Sarvjit Kaur all great singers are also hailed from Shahkot. In wrestling Mehardin won the title of Rustam-e-hind or Hind Kesri and became internationally known. Sh. Jagir Nahar is a player and coach of volleyball of the national level. S.Davinder Sinh Ahluwalia president of Yuwa Shakti Punjab, is connected with many national and international Institutions. The famous comedian writer Sher Jang Jangli has close relation with Shahkot. The poet Josh Malsiani inhabited Malsian only 5 kilometers away from Shahkot.
According to the census of 1991, the population of Shahkot was 10240 and it got in the status of Sub-Division. Shahkot is on its way to progress. The building of I.T.I. is being built. The Railway Station is 2-3 kilometers away from here and it connects ludhiana-ferozepur. The Government has decided to upgrade the Rly.Station. The Govt. middle School(Nimman Wala School) is half a century old and it has not been upgraded until now.
Famous for its chillies in all over India this town falls in the Lohian Constituency. The people here are politically awake. S.Balwant Singh, who was taken as the brain of the Akali Dal, became Finance Minister of the Punjab after winning from here, S.Brij Bhupinder Singh Kang Became the Home Minister of the Punjab. Ajit Singh Kohar (Dodian Wala Baba), after winning elections from here is the minister of the Punjab.
Shahkot is one of the 117 legislative areas of Punjab. Ex Defence Services Jail Agriculture Election Legal And Legislative Affaris Employment Generation Transport Minister Punjab Late Jathedar Ajit Singh Kohar, Dodian Wala Baba is the Former member From This legislative assembly constituency. Jathedar Ajit Singh Ji Kohar Sahab (Dodian Wala Baba) Was Regularly Win From This Constituency From 1997 2002 2007 2012 2017 Hold The Record For 21 Years.Jathedar Ajit Singh Ji Kohar Sahab (Dodian Wala Baba) Was Also Hold The Position Of President Of Shiromani Akali Dal District Jalandhar (Rural) From 1996 To 2018.

See also
Bajwa Jalandhar
Malsian
Giddarpindi
poonian

References

External links
 Shahkot On Google Maps
 Shahkot Map On Shahkotcity.com

Cities and towns in Jalandhar district